Darun Kala or Darun Kola may refer to:
 Darun Kola-ye Gharbi
 Darun Kola-ye Sharqi